Solar power in Maryland is supported by the state's legislation regarding the Renewable Portfolio Standard and Solar Renewable Energy Credit (SREC) program. The target for renewable energy as of 2017 is 20% by 2020, including 2% from solar power.

According to the Maryland Energy Administration, Maryland is exposed to approximately 5.3kWh per square meter of solar energy on a daily basis, and as of 2016, the state had 508 MW installed which ranks Maryland 11th in the nation for installed solar capacity.

State and local incentives
Various tax credits are available for Maryland solar power system installations, as of January 2017 the vast majority of county property tax credits have expired, a full list of remaining tax credits is available from DSIRE. The Maryland Energy Administration offers a $1000 grant for residential PV systems between 2 and 20 kW of DC power at STC and $500 for solar hot water (solar thermal). Commercial installations are granted $60/kW (max. 100 kW) for solar panels and $20/square foot (max. 250 square feet) for solar thermal systems.

Net metering

Consumer net-metering and SRECs are available in the state of Maryland for owners of both solar PV systems and, as of the May 22, 2012 signing of S.B. 791, solar hot water systems. Solar hot water systems have a 5 SREC limit. The passage of H.B. 1187, also on May 22, 2012, accelerates the state's Renewable Energy Portfolio Standard with a target of 20% by 2020, of which 2% must be solar. Currently, there is no limit on the system size for a photovoltaic system.

In the state of Maryland, one SREC is equal to one MWh of electricity production, and is redeemable for three years. As of January 2017, an SREC is valued at $18, and if the RPS is not increased is expected to further decline as the solar/renewable energy further saturates the electricity supply. In addition, solar thermal that is installed for recreational purposes, such as heating a swimming pool, is not eligible for incentives.

Legislation

Economic impact
Maryland's goals for the Renewable Portfolio Standard have led to various monetary incentives, and have led to the expansion of local companies offering solar panel installation and services. Additionally, Governor Martin O'Malley stated that he aims to add 100,000 local green jobs by 2015. There are currently at least 183 companies in Maryland involved in installing, distributing, designing or selling solar systems.

Impact on farmland 
By 2016, citizens had raised concerns about plans to build solar farms on prime farmland in Washington County, and on the Eastern Shore, in Kent County and Talbot County.

Statistics

Installed capacity

A 5.5-MW solar farm near Hughesville generates enough power for 600 homes, and offsets the pollution of 1,600 cars. 

A 4.3 MW solar farm in Cambridge supplies about 40% of the power for the National Aquarium in Baltimore, and saves about 1,300 metric tons of carbon dioxide during the summer.

Utility-scale generation

Major solar companies in Maryland 
Maryland has a diverse mix of both regional solar installers and most of the national installers. Many of the companies specialize in specific types of transactions such as large scale commercial projects or residential leased system. There are an estimated 183 companies in Maryland involved in solar. 
 Solar Energy World
 American Sentry Solar
 Standard Solar
 Direct Energy Solar
 Maryland State Solar
 Vivint
 Solarcity
 Trinity Solar

See also
Wind power in Maryland
Solar power in the United States
Renewable energy in the United States

References

Renewable energy in Maryland
Maryland
Science and technology in Maryland